= Women and Birds =

Painting by Joan Miró

- Artist: Joan Miró
- Year: 1963

Women and Birds (French: Femmes et Oiseaux) is a 1963 painting by the Catalan artist Joan Miró. In February 2014 it was expected to be sold at auction for between $6.5m and $11.5m, but the auction was cancelled.
